Flegg is a surname. Notable people with the name include:

Bob Flegg (1918–44), Australian rules footballer
Bruce Flegg (born 1954), Australian politician
Chris Flegg (late 20th c.), British singer, guitarist and song writer
Jennifer Flegg, Australian mathematician
Jersey Flegg (1878–1960), Anglo-Australian rugby league player and administrator
Jim Flegg OBE (late 20th c.), British ornithologist and writer

See also
Jersey Flegg Cup, junior rugby league competition in New South Wales
Flegg High School, Martham, Norfolk, England